Cedar Hill Prep School is a non-sectarian private school in the Somerset section of Franklin Township, New Jersey, offering education from Preschool to Grade 8. 

Cedar Hill Prep School services students from 23 towns around the New Jersey-Pennsylvania region. Akin to trends throughout the United States, Somerset’s and central New Jersey’s fastest growing subgroups among the school-age population are the English Language Learners (ELL). Cedar Hill Prep’s vibrant community embodies diversity, unity, and cultural immersion, while believing education should transcend textbooks. As our community members are representatives of over 25 countries, they embrace these cultural differences and are curious to imbibe, immerse, and understand the world. This integral part of the Cedar Hill Prep culture is reflective of its curriculum.

The school educates children from towns in central New Jersey including Somerset, south Bound Brook, Bridgewater Township, New Brunswick, North Brunswick, South Brunswick, South Plainfield, Edison and Piscataway.

As of the 2022-23, the school had an enrollment of 250 students, and 40 classroom teachers (on an FTE basis), for a student–teacher ratio of 10:1.

History

Cedar Hill Prep School was founded in 2003 under the name Oakcrest Academy. Cedar Hill Prep School/Oakcrest Academy was founded by Nandini Menon and Raghu Menon.

The turning point for Oakcrest Academy was in 2006, when the school had reached its full capacity. The options were to either limit the growth or extend the vision to be a full-fledged Elementary / Middle school. The founders heeded to the unanimous coercion of the parents, and forged with their vision and bought a 9 acre property with the intent of building a state of the art school. The new building was ready in February 2007 and the school was christened Cedar Hill Prep School.

Cedar Hill Prep School is the recipient of the 2017 National Blue Ribbon Award for Exemplary High Performing School. The school is accredited by The Middle States Association.

Curriculum
 Preschool to kindergarten – Language Arts, Mathematics, Science, Social Studies, French, Spanish, Music and Art.
 Elementary school - Language Arts, Mathematics, Science, Social Studies, French, Spanish, Chorus, Wind Instruments and Art.
 Middle school - Language Arts, Mathematics, Science, Engineering, Technology, Social Studies, French, Spanish, Chorus, Theater, Wind Instruments, Strings, Graphic Design, and Art.

Extracurricular activities
Chorus, Chess, Music Club, Mad Science, Math League, National Geography Bee, Debate League, Robotics, Soccer, Basketball, Drama Club, Concert Choir, Band, and much more. Please visit www.cedarhillprep.com for the latest updates.

Administration
 Nandini Menon, Founder
 Donald Seeley, Principal

References

https://nationalblueribbonschools.ed.gov/awardwinners/winning/17nj101pv_cedar_hill_preparatory_school.html

External links
cedarhillprep.com

2003 establishments in New Jersey
Educational institutions established in 2003
Franklin Township, Somerset County, New Jersey
Private elementary schools in New Jersey
Private middle schools in New Jersey
Private schools in Somerset County, New Jersey